You Once Told Me is the first officially released studio album from Andain, succeeding ten years of various works and performances.

Overview
Released on September 24, 2012 through Black Hole, You Once Told Me had been written over a span of four years, from 2007 to 2011. The album was promoted with three singles prior to its release, starting with "Promises" in June 2011, "Much Too Much" by the end of January 2012, and "Turn Up the Sound" on June 18, 2012. After much patience following unsettled circumstances, the album was officially announced on August 10, 2012, on Andain's official Facebook page. With a complementary note about album previews to come the following week, a teaser of the album track "Like" was posted on Facebook, on August 17, 2012. Soon after, an official album preview was exclusively announced to readers of the online promotion portal Beatsmedia, which was made available on August 21, 2012, through Andain's official SoundCloud page. The announcement also included an exclusive video message from Mavie, where she shares a few words about the album, including the meaning behind the chosen title. 

With a track list of eleven songs, the album revolves around a style of hybrid electronica with acoustic elements and slight influences from rock music. Some songs lean more towards one direction than the other, where for instance "Like" and "Ave Maria" are more based around electronic sounds, while "After" and "What It's Like" are significantly characterised by electric guitar and acoustic percussion instruments. At the same time, the album was also written with an intent to maintain a sense of overall coherency, keeping the selection of instruments consistent between the tracks. Mavie's vocal performances permeate throughout the album with emotive and soulful lyrics, colouring each track with varying levels of vocal harmonics, also reflecting upon Mavie's choral background and love for harmonization.

Deluxe Version
In addition to the standard physical and digital formats, You Once Told Me was also released as an exclusive iTunes LP Deluxe Version. In addition to the content presented with the physical pressing, the interactive version also featured bonus material, including the original version of "Summer Calling"; the Gabriel & Dresden remix of "Beautiful Things"; six additional remixes taken from the three promotional singles, including an exclusive remix of "Promises" by Jaytech; the three music videos from the respective singles; exclusive artwork; and photos from the making of the different music videos.

Bonus tracks
Aside from the Deluxe Version, additional bonus tracks were also offered with the digital release from select retailers. For the Beatport release, two additional remixes of "Promises" by Jaytech and Maor Levi were added as bonus tracks. Alternatively, Amazon.com offered three of the bonus tracks from the Deluxe Version, including KOAN Sound's remix of "Promises", Rido's remix of "Much Too Much", and Stratus' remix of "Turn Up the Sound".

Track listing

Credits and personnel
All songs written and produced by Josh Gabriel and Mavie Marcos. Additional writing by Dave Dresden on tracks 1–3, 5–9, and 11 (plus 13 on Deluxe Version), and David Penner on tracks 4, 5 and 10 (plus 12 and 13 on Deluxe Version).

Notes

References

External links
 Album preview on Andain's official SoundCloud page
 Album preview exclusive at Beatsmedia
 Official video tour of Deluxe Version on YouTube

2012 debut albums
Black Hole Recordings albums
Electronic albums by American artists